Beneath the Boardwalk refers to a collection of 18 demo recordings by Sheffield band Arctic Monkeys which were burned onto CDs to give away at the band's gigs for free, and which emerged on the Internet in 2004, promptly file-shared amongst fans.

Background
The name Beneath the Boardwalk originated when the first batch of demos were sent around on the Internet. The first sender, wanting to classify the demos, named them after the club where he received them, the Boardwalk in Sheffield — a since defunct venue where the Arctic Monkeys used to play gigs and Alex Turner used to work. Slowly, as more demos were spread online, they were all classified under this name. This has led to many people falsely believing that Beneath the Boardwalk was an early album, or that the early demos were all released under this heading.

In a 2005 interview with Prefix Magazine, Arctic Monkeys drummer Matt Helders said: 

The demos have been available for download since at least 2008 from the fansite arctic-monkeys.com.

Legacy
Many of the songs featured in the collection (tracks 1, 5, 6, 8, 10, 11, 12 and 14) went on to appear later — albeit re-recorded — on Arctic Monkeys' debut album, Whatever People Say I Am, That's What I'm Not. The track "Cigarette Smoke" was later reworked into "Cigarette Smoker Fiona" for the Who the Fuck Are Arctic Monkeys? EP.  "Scummy" was also re-recorded and re-titled as "When The Sun Goes Down". "Bigger Boys and Stolen Sweethearts" was released as a B-side of the "I Bet You Look Good on the Dancefloor" single, and "Stickin' to the Floor" became a B-side on the "When the Sun Goes Down" single. The remaining tracks have not been commercially released.

Track listing
The track list itself is a source of ambiguity as there is no official version of the collection. The collection was added to as more demos emerged from CDs given out for free by the band after gigs. Some variations of the collection included rare live performances.

Personnel
Arctic Monkeys
Alex Turner – lead vocals, lead and rhythm guitar
Jamie Cook – rhythm and lead guitar
Andy Nicholson – bass guitar, backing vocals
Matt Helders – drums, percussion, backing vocals

References 

2004 albums
Arctic Monkeys albums